Jedousov is a municipality and village in Pardubice District in the Pardubice Region of the Czech Republic. It has about 200 inhabitants.

Administrative parts
The village of Loděnice is an administrative part of Jedousov.

References

External links

Villages in Pardubice District